Sandy Run is a stream in the U.S. state of West Virginia.

Sandy Run The creek possibly was named after Jennie Sandy, a pioneer who settled there.

See also
List of rivers of West Virginia

References

Rivers of Doddridge County, West Virginia
Rivers of Tyler County, West Virginia
Rivers of West Virginia